1900 Katyusha is a stony background asteroid from the inner asteroid belt, approximately 9 kilometers in diameter. It was discovered on 16 December 1971, by Russian astronomer Tamara Smirnova at the Crimean Astrophysical Observatory in Nauchnyj, on the Crimean peninsula and named in honor of Yekaterina Zelenko, the only woman to credited with conducting an aerial ramming.

Orbit and classification 

Katyusha is a member of the Flora family, one of the largest groups of stony asteroids in the inner main-belt. It orbits the Sun in the inner main-belt at a distance of 1.9–2.5 AU once every 3 years and 3 months (1,200 days). Its orbit has an eccentricity of 0.13 and an inclination of 7° with respect to the ecliptic.

Naming 

This minor planet was named in honor of Ukrainian Yekaterina Zelenko (1916–1941), a war pilot and Hero of the Soviet Union, known for being the only woman who had ever executed an aerial ramming. The asteroid's name "Katyusha" is a petname for Ekaterina.

Physical characteristics 

It rotates around its axis with a period of  hours and with a brightness variation of  magnitude, indicating a non-spheroidal shape.

According to the survey carried out by NASA's Wide-field Infrared Survey Explorer with its subsequent NEOWISE mission, Katyusha measures between 8.820 and 9 kilometers in diameter and its surface has an albedo between 0.29 and 0.299. Katyusha has been characterized as a S-type asteroid.

References

External links 
 Asteroid Lightcurve Database (LCDB), query form (info )
 Dictionary of Minor Planet Names, Google books
 Asteroids and comets rotation curves, CdR – Observatoire de Genève, Raoul Behrend
 Discovery Circumstances: Numbered Minor Planets (1)-(5000) – Minor Planet Center
 
 

001900
Discoveries by Tamara Mikhaylovna Smirnova
Named minor planets
19711216